Doris Hart and Pat Todd defeated the defending champions Louise Brough and Margaret Osborne  in the final, 3–6, 6–4, 7–5 to win the ladies' doubles tennis title at the 1947 Wimbledon Championships.

Seeds

  Louise Brough /  Margaret Osborne (final)
  Doris Hart /  Pat Todd (champions)
  Jean Bostock /  Betty Hilton (semifinals)
  Nancye Bolton /  Nell Hopman (quarterfinals)

Draw

Finals

Top half

Section 1

Section 2

The nationality of Miss BM Crosoer is unknown.

Bottom half

Section 3

Section 4

References

External links

Women's Doubles
Wimbledon Championship by year – Women's doubles
Wimbledon Championships
Wimbledon Championships